Michael David Bordo (born 1942 in Montreal, Quebec) is a Canadian and American economist, currently Board of Governors Professor of Economics and Distinguished Professor of Economics at Rutgers University. He is a research associate at the National Bureau of Economic Research as well as a Distinguished Visiting Fellow at the Hoover Institution at Stanford University. He is the third most influential economic historian worldwide according to the RePEc/IDEAS rankings. He was a student of Milton Friedman and has co-authored numerous books and articles with Anna Schwartz.

Education 
Bordo was born in Montreal, Quebec, in 1942. After obtaining a B.A. at McGill University in 1963, Bordo completed an MSc in economics at the London School of Economics. He went on to the University of Chicago where he obtained a PhD in 1972, working under the supervision of Milton Friedman.

Career and contribution 
Bordo started his career at Carleton University, Ottawa from 1969 to 1980. From 1981 to 1989, Bordo was Professor of Economics at the University of South Carolina before taking on the role of Professor of Economics at Rutgers University.  Bordo is currently Professor of Economics and Director of the Center for Monetary and Financial History at Rutgers University, New Brunswick.

He held many visiting positions at universities worldwide (including University of California-Los Angeles, Princeton, Harvard, Cambridge and the London School of Economics) as well as central banks and international monetary institutions (including the IMF, Federal Reserve Banks of St. Louis, Cleveland, the Federal Reserve Board of Governors, the Bank of Canada, the Bank of England and the Bank for International Settlements). He is a member of the Shadow Open Market Committee, an independent group of economists, who provide a monetarist alternative to the views on monetary policy.

He has been and is on the editorial board of numerous academic journals, including the International Journal of Central Banking, the Journal of International Money and Finance, the Journal of Economic History and Explorations in Economic History. His research focuses mainly on economic and financial history, monetary economics and history of economic thought. He has written extensively on exchange rate regimes such as the Gold Standard and the Bretton Woods system. Another area of expertise is the Great Depression and financial crisis in general. He also researches globalization in historical perspective.

Selected works 
 A Retrospective on the Classical Gold Standard, 1821–1931, with Anna J. Schwartz, University of Chicago Press, 1984.
 Money in Historical Perspective, with Anna J. Schwartz, University of Chicago Press, 1987.
 A Retrospective on the Bretton Woods System: Lessons for International Monetary Reform, with Barry Eichengreen, University of Chicago Press, 1993.
 The Gold Standard and Related Regimes: Collected Essays, Cambridge University Press, 2005.
 The Defining Moment: The Great Depression and the American Economy in the Twentieth Century, with Claudia Goldin and Eugene N. White, University of Chicago Press, 2007.
 The Origins, History, and Future of the Federal Reserve: A Return to Jekyll Island, with William Roberds, Cambridge University Press, 2013.
 Strained Relations: US Foreign-Exchange Operations and Monetary Policy in the Twentieth Century, with Owen Humpage and Anna J. Schwartz,  University of Chicago Press, 2015.

References

External links 
 

1942 births
Living people
Academics from Montreal
Canadian economists
Economic historians
20th-century American economists
21st-century American economists
Hoover Institution people
McGill University alumni
Alumni of the London School of Economics
University of Chicago alumni
University of South Carolina faculty
Rutgers University faculty
Presidents of the Economic History Association